Spotlight or spot light may refer to:

Lighting
 Spot lights, automotive auxiliary lamps
 Spotlight (theatre lighting)
 Spotlight, a searchlight
 Stage lighting instrument, stage lighting instruments, of several types

Art, entertainment, and media

Films 
 Spotlight (film), a 2015 American drama film
The Spotlight (film), a 1927 American comedy silent film

Music

Albums
 Spotlight, a 2001 album by Tír na nÓg
 Spotlight, a 2007 album by Djumbo
 Spotlight, a 2009 album by Antoine Clamaran
 Spotlight, a 2016 EP by Up10tion

Songs
 "Spotlight" (Madonna song), 1988
 "Spotlight" (Jennifer Hudson song), 2008
 "Spotlight" (Gucci Mane song), 2009
 "Spotlight" (Mutemath song), 2009
 "Spotlight" (Marshmello and Lil Peep song), 2018
 "Spotlight" (Jessie Ware song), 2020
 "Spotlight" (Xiao Zhan song), 2020
 "Spotlight", song by Kylie Minogue from the album Disco, 2020
 "Spotlight". song by The Sweet from the album Funny How Sweet Co-Co Can Be, 1971
 "Spotlight", song by Selena Gomez & the Scene from the album A Year Without Rain, 2010
 "Spotlight", song by Shakira from the album Shakira, 2014
 "Spotlight", 2005 song by Fayray

Periodicals 
SPOTLIGHT, Con Edison's newsletter
 The Spotlight, a weekly American newspaper, now out of print

Television 
 Spotlight (BBC News), BBC's regional news programme for the southwest of England
 Spotlight (BBC Northern Ireland television programme), a current affairs programme in Northern Ireland
 Spotlight (Canadian TV program), a 1975 Canadian current affairs television program that aired on CBC
 Spotlight (South Korean TV series), a 2008 South Korean television series that aired on Munhwa Broadcasting Corporation (MBC)
 Spotlight (TV channel), a defunct premium movie channel
 Spotlight TV, a British music channel

Enterprises and organizations
 Spotlight (Boston Globe), a newspaper investigative team, in US
 Spotlight (company), a UK casting service company featuring directories of actors and actresses
 Spotlight Group, Australian retail conglomerate

Technology
 Spotlight (Apple), search technology integrated into macOS and iOS
 DBpedia Spotlight, named entity extraction for DBpedia resources
 Spotlight SAR, a technique to improve resolution for synthetic-aperture radar
 SpotLight GPS Pet Locator, a product of Positioning Animals Worldwide
 Windows Spotlight

Other
 Spotlight effect, phenomenon in which people tend to believe they are being noticed more than they really are
 Celebrity, the spotlight
 SPOTLIGHT project, a European Commission-funded research project on health promotion

See also
 Light (disambiguation)
 Limelight (disambiguation)
 Spot (disambiguation)